Benjamin Timothy Arthur (born April 26, 1982, in San Francisco, California) is an American animator . He gained modest acclaim for his animation Once Upon a Time in the Woods, a Rotoscope of his younger brother Julian during a walk in the woods, which has been in numerous film contests around the world and on Current TV.

Arthur also animated the popular "Why Can't We Walk Straight?" and "The Billion Bug Highway" animations for NPR's Robert Krulwich. Arthur (along with Krulwich) was the recipient of a third-place Multimedia Innovation award from the White House News Photographers Association's 2011 Eyes of History: New Media Contest.

References

External links 
 

Animators from California
Living people
1982 births
Artists from San Francisco
21st-century American artists